"W.T.F." is the 10th episode of the 13th season of the American animated television series South Park. The 191st overall episode of the series, it originally aired on Comedy Central in the United States on October 21, 2009. In the episode, the South Park boys form their own backyard wrestling league, drawing droves of fans more interested in the acting and scripted dramatic storylines than athletic elements.

"W.T.F." was written and directed by series co-creator Trey Parker, and was rated TV-MA L in the United States. The episode parodied several aspects of professional wrestling, highlighting the sport's emphasis on such theatrical elements as costumes, back stories and scripted storylines. The episode demonstrated how amateur wrestling is often afforded less respect because of pro wrestling, and it presents pro wrestling fans as deluded rednecks while also likening them to middle-class theatregoers.

"W.T.F." specifically parodies World Wrestling Entertainment and  its chairman, Vince McMahon. The episode received generally mixed reviews, with several commentators calling professional wrestling too easy a target for South Park satire. According to Nielsen ratings, "W.T.F." was seen by 1.37 million households among viewers aged between 18 and 49.

Plot
After watching a live WWE match between WWE superstars Edge and John Cena at the Pepsi Center and being totally enthralled, Kyle, Stan, Cartman, Kenny, Butters, Jimmy and Token decide to join the school's wrestling team, unaware how different the sport is from professional wrestling. They all feel that the wrestling coach Mr. Connors's teaching of "real wrestling", or "wrassling", is too homoerotic and immediately quit the class to form their own backyard wrestling league called "the Wrestling Takedown Federation" (W.T.F.), much to the frustration of Mr. Connors. The boys' federation relies heavily on theatrical elements and scripted storylines, with such characters as a Russian who belittles Americans (played by Cartman), a veteran of the Vietnam War (played by Stan) and a girl who has had fourteen abortions (also played by Cartman). Their audience grows quickly, and consists mostly of rednecks who believe the action is real and the dialogue reflects actual events. As its popularity increases, the boys add an auditorium, complete with proscenium staging and theater-style lighting, to the back of Cartman's house. Soon, the events see the performers reciting dramatic monologues more often than engaging in wrestling and stunt work.

Mr. Connors is fired by the school board due to the violence associated with wrestling, after the board fails to make a distinction between what he teaches and professional wrestling (as do the town bar regulars). They also find videos of Greco-Roman and freestyle wrestling on his iPhone and mistake them for gay pornography. The boys are excited to learn WWE Chairman Vince McMahon has heard of their federation and will be scouting one of their shows. Mr. Connors sits in his apartment surrounded by awards for wrestling and in tears over his termination and what wrestling has become. Vengeful, he plans to sabotage the event in a personal vow to restore the integrity of the wrestling sport. Cartman, Stan, Kyle and Kenny secretly decide to relegate Butters, Jimmy and Token to smaller roles, thinking that it will give themselves a better opportunity to impress McMahon. They hold tryouts in the manner of a theater audition in order to find new talent for their show, which is now more reminiscent of musical theatre than wrestling.

Mr. Connors sneaks into the event and unsuccessfully attempts to destroy the wrestling ring with a rocket launcher, killing Kenny instead. He runs into the ring and chastises the crowd with an impassioned monologue about how professional wrestling has ruined real wrestling, and the downward spiral his life has taken since it cost him his job (as well as everything else). The crowd begins to sympathize with him, angrily chanting, "They took his job!" McMahon is impressed with the speech and decides to sign Mr. Connors to the WWE—much to his delight. The boys are frustrated at losing their latest shot at stardom and began brawling amongst themselves, blaming each other for the lost opportunity. Unimpressed by the genuine wrestling and real conflicted drama, the crowd deems it "fake" and begins to leave.

Theme

"W.T.F." was written and directed by series co-founder Trey Parker, and was rated TV-MA L in the United States. It first aired on October 21, 2009 in the United States on Comedy Central. "W.T.F." parodies several aspects of professional wrestling, a form of theatre involving mock combat and catch wrestling, in which matches, along with pre- and post-match commentary and action, are choreographed and scripted. The South Park episode highlights the theatrical elements of professional wrestling, such as the costumes, back stories and scripted dramatic storylines. The fans are portrayed as far more interested in these theatrical elements than any actual athletic feats. The theatrical aspect of professional wrestling are often over-exaggerated in "W.T.F." to add comedic emphasis and satire. For example, a try-out involves no actual wrestling at all, but rather dramatic monologues, and resembles the audition scene from the Broadway musical "A Chorus Line". Similarly, Vince McMahon watches one of the matches from a balcony wearing opera glasses, similar to that of a theatre rather than a traditional wrestling venue.

The episode also demonstrates how amateur wrestling, an actual non-choreographed sport with such styles as Greco-Roman and freestyle, is often afforded less respect due to professional wrestling. The boys initially mistake this form of wrestling for the scripted professional wrestling they are used to, and then are uninterested in it when they learn about the actual sport. The moves and holds their teacher tries to teach them are interpreted by the boys as homoerotic and treated with disrespect. The gym teacher, Mr. Connors, is portrayed as showing despair for what professional wrestling has done to harm "real wrestling", culminating in a final scene in which he makes a tearful rant to the crowd at one of the boys' wrestling matches.

"W.T.F." also mocks fans of professional wrestling, who are portrayed largely as stereotypical rednecks who believe the scripted storylines are real. The wrestling matches in "W.T.F." are purposely fake-looking to emphasize the scripted nature of professional wrestling, and utilize elements typically featured in real matches, like the use of metal folding chairs as weapons. The professional wrestling characters created by the South Park boys, such as Cartman's "the Rad Russian", are similar to the gimmick-based types of characters created by actual professional wrestling leagues, like The Iron Sheik. These characters, too, are portrayed in an over-the-top way to emphasize the comedic satire of professional wrestling. This is particularly illustrated with the use of one of Cartman's characters, a female diva who claims to have had so many abortions, she has become addicted to them.

Cultural references

Vince McMahon, the chairman of World Wrestling Entertainment and occasional professional wrestler himself, is featured prominently in "W.T.F." Various aspects of the World Wrestling Entertainment company are featured in "W.T.F." John Cena and Edge, professional wrestlers who have both worked for the WWE, appear in a match against each other. Both are portrayed by voice actors, not the actual wrestlers themselves. The South Park boys host a "W.T.F. Smackdown" event, a reference to the WWE SmackDown television program. Token's W.T.F attire resembles the attire of WWE wrestler R-Truth. A wrestling try-out held by the boys resembles scenes from the Broadway musical A Chorus Line, which involves Broadway dancers auditioning for spots on a chorus line. One of the people trying out sings a musical number about why he wants to be a wrestler, which parodies the song "Nothing" from A Chorus Line. The episode also includes references to the musical Fame, the film Waiting for Guffman and the reality television series American Idol. When Cartman and Kenny order a meeting with Stan and Kyle to discuss the wrestling league, they meet at a Sizzler, a steak- and seafood-restaurant chain.

Reception
In its original American broadcast on October 21, 2009, "W.T.F" was watched by 1.37 million overall households among viewers aged between 18 and 34, according to Nielsen ratings. Among that age group, it ranked behind the FX drama series Sons of Anarchy, which drew 1.43 million household viewers, as well as game five of the 2009 National League Championship Series on TBS (1.56 million households) and a National Football League game between the Denver Broncos and San Diego Chargers on ESPN (3.57 million households).

"W.T.F." received generally mixed reviews. Ramsey Isler of IGN said the professional wrestling parody was "pretty spot on", but that the target was too easy, and the episode "lacks a lot of the punchy kind of comedy that the show is usually known for". Nevertheless, Isler said the writing was clever  and had funny moments, like Kenny's "El Pollo Loco" character, and the scene where the gym teacher tries to take down a security guard with a traditional wrestling move. Josh Modell of The A.V. Club gave the episode a C+ grade and called it "one of those too-common SP episodes that could've been cut in half". Modell said the true-to-life way the boys formed their wrestling company was "great" and that the parody of professional wrestling was on target, but also said they "have been told a million times before. They're not really jokes at this point."

Carlos Delgado of iF Magazine gave the episode a C+ grade, saying professional wrestling seems like a topic South Park should have mocked long ago. Delgado said the best scenes were the first moments of the boys' wrestling league, but that the "novelty of the idea starts to fade" and the developments become too outrageous. Maclean's writer Jamie Weinman criticized the episode and said professional wrestling was "not exactly a timely target". Not all reviews were negative. Salon.com writer Mary Elizabeth Williams called the show "perennially offensive [and] still shockingly funny", and particularly praised Cartman's wrestling character "Bad Irene", who professes a love of and addiction to abortions. Williams called it, "a reminder that the heated debate over choice frequently serves as America's prime-time entertainment".

Home release
"W.T.F.", along with the thirteen other episodes from South Park'''s thirteenth season, were released on a three-disc DVD set and two-disc Blu-ray set in the United States on March 16, 2010. The sets included brief audio commentaries by Parker and Stone for each episode, a collection of deleted scenes, and a special mini-feature Inside Xbox: A Behind-the-Scenes Tour of South Park Studios, which discussed the process behind animating the show with Inside Xbox'' host Major Nelson.

References

External links
 "W.T.F" Full episode at South Park Studios
 

South Park (season 13) episodes
Professional wrestling-related mass media